= Luis Bruno Barreiro =

Canadian geneticist

- Born: Portugal
- Known for: Research on the evolution and genetics of human immune response variation
- Scientific career
- Fields: Human genetics; immunogenomics
- Institutions: University of Chicago; Université de Montréal

Luis Bruno Barreiro is a Portuguese geneticist, currently faculty at the University of Chicago and formerly a Canada Research Chair at Université de Montréal. He is best known for his research on the evolution and genetics of human variation in the immune response to pathogens.
